In mathematics, the polygamma function of order  is a meromorphic function on the complex numbers  defined as the th derivative of the logarithm of the gamma function:

Thus

At all the nonpositive integers these polygamma functions have a pole of order . The function  is sometimes called the trigamma function.

Integral representation

where  is the Hurwitz zeta function.

Setting  in the above formula does not give an integral representation of the digamma function.  The digamma function has an integral representation, due to Gauss, which is similar to the  case above but which has an extra term .

Recurrence relation
It satisfies the recurrence relation

which – considered for positive integer argument – leads to a presentation of the sum of reciprocals of the powers of the natural numbers:

and

for all , where  is the Euler–Mascheroni constant. The case  must be treated differently because  is not normalizable at infinity (the sum of the reciprocals doesn't converge).

Reflection relation

where  is alternately an odd or even polynomial of degree  with integer coefficients and leading coefficient . They obey the recursion equation

Multiplication theorem
The multiplication theorem gives

and

for the digamma function.

Series representation
The polygamma function has the series representation

This representation can be written more compactly in terms of the Hurwitz zeta function as

This relation can for example be used to compute the special values

Alternately, the Hurwitz zeta can be understood to generalize the polygamma to arbitrary, non-integer order.

One more series may be permitted for the polygamma functions. As given by Schlömilch,

This is a result of the Weierstrass factorization theorem. Thus, the gamma function may now be defined as:

Now, the natural logarithm of the gamma function is easily representable:

Finally, we arrive at a summation representation for the polygamma function:

Where  is the Kronecker delta.

Also the Lerch transcendent
 

can be denoted in terms of polygamma function

Taylor series

and

Here,  is the Riemann zeta function. This series is easily derived from the corresponding Taylor series for the Hurwitz zeta function. This series may be used to derive a number of rational zeta series.

Asymptotic expansion
These non-converging series can be used to get quickly an approximation value with a certain numeric at-least-precision for large arguments:

 
and

where we have chosen , i.e. the Bernoulli numbers of the second kind.

Inequalities
The hyperbolic cotangent satisfies the inequality

and this implies that the function

It follows that the Laplace transform of this function is completely monotone. By the integral representation above, we conclude that

is completely monotone.  The convexity inequality  implies that

See also
 Factorial
 Gamma function
 Digamma function
 Trigamma function
 Generalized polygamma function

References

 

Gamma and related functions